Liang Boqiang 梁伯强 (1 February 1899 – 28 November 1968, Jiaying, Guangdong, China) Chinese pathologist, member of Chinese Academy of Sciences, pioneer pathologist in China.

1899 births
1968 deaths
20th-century Chinese physicians
Biologists from Guangdong
Chinese pathologists
Educators from Guangdong
Hakka scientists
Members of the Chinese Academy of Sciences
People from Meixian District
Physicians from Guangdong
Scientists from Guangdong
Academic staff of Sun Yat-sen University